Aros may refer to:

Aros (Middle-earth), a river in J. R. R. Tolkien's Middle-earth legendarium
Aros, Mull, the location of Aros Castle, a ruined 13th-century castle on the Isle of Mull, Scotland
AROS Research Operating System, a free software implementation of AmigaOS
 Aros, the original Viking name of Aarhus, the second largest city in Denmark
ARoS Aarhus Kunstmuseum, an art museum in Aarhus
Aros Centre, a cultural centre on the Isle of Skye
Asia Regional Organic Standard (AROS)
Aros, farm in Kintyre, Scotland, birthplace of William McTaggart senior, Scottish painter

Åros
Åros (with the letter Å) may refer to:
Åros, a village in Asker, Norway
Åros, Søgne, a village in Southern Norway

See also
Aro (disambiguation)